Ruth Aturo (born 19 July 1995) is a Ugandan footballer who plays as a goalkeeper for FUFA Women Super League club UCU Lady Cardinals FC and the Uganda women's national team.

Club career
Aturo has played for UCU Lady Cardinals in Uganda.

International career
Aturo capped for Uganda at senior level during the 2021 COSAFA Women's Championship and the 2022 Africa Women Cup of Nations qualification.

References

1995 births
Living people
Uganda Christian University alumni
People from Soroti District
Ugandan women's footballers
Women's association football goalkeepers
Uganda women's international footballers
Saudi Women's Premier League players